Cyclacel Pharmaceuticals Inc. is a biotechnology firm based in Berkeley Heights, New Jersey and Dundee, Scotland, developing cancer treatments. Cyclacel was founded in 1996 by David Lane, PhD.

Company overview 

Cyclacel Pharmaceuticals, Inc. is a clinical-stage, biopharmaceutical company developing innovative cancer medicines based on cell cycle, transcriptional regulation and mitosis biology. The transcriptional regulation program is evaluating fadraciclib, a CDK2/9 inhibitor, and the anti-mitotic program CYC140, a PLK1 inhibitor, in patients with both solid tumors and hematological malignancies. Cyclacel’s strategy is to build a diversified biopharmaceutical business based on a pipeline of novel drug candidates addressing oncology and hematology indications. For additional information, please visit www.cyclacel.com.

Sir David Lane, PhD, a recognized leader in the field of tumor suppressor biology, who discovered the p53 protein, founded the company in 1996. In 1999, Cyclacel Pharmaceuticals was joined by David Glover, PhD, a recognized leader in the mechanism of mitosis or cell division, who discovered, among other cell cycle targets, the mitotic kinases, Polo and Aurora, enzymes that act in the mitosis phase of the cell cycle.

Companies listed on the Nasdaq
Pharmaceutical companies based in New Jersey
Pharmaceutical companies of Scotland
Companies based in Dundee
Science and technology in Dundee